The 28th RTHK Top 10 Gold Songs Awards was held in 2006 for the 2005 music season.

Top 10 song awards
The top 10 songs (十大中文金曲) of 2006 are as follows.

Other awards

References
 Hunan TV Entertainment

RTHK Top 10 Gold Songs Awards
Rthk Top 10 Gold Songs Awards, 2005
Rthk Top 10 Gold Songs Awards, 2005